Michael Hamilton Kawalya-Kaggwa was the Katikiro (chief minister) of the Ugandan Kingdom of Buganda from 1945 to 1950. He died on 9 September 1971 leaving behind a large family including a widow, Mrs. Olive Amelia Kawalya Kaggwa (of Ghanaian decent) and her two sons. Kawalya Kaggwa's father, Apollo Kaggwa, was an influential Katikiro and regent.

References

Ugandan politicians
Katikkiros of Buganda